Greek basketball clubs in European and worldwide competitions is the performance record of men's professional basketball clubs from Greece's top-tier level league, the Greek Basket League, in international competitions.

History
Greek professional basketball clubs have played in European-wide competitions since the 1957–58 season, when Panellinios took part in the European top-tier level FIBA European Champions Cup (now called EuroLeague). Basketball was the first team sport in which Greek teams won a European-wide competition. AEK won the 2nd-tier level FIBA European Cup Winners' Cup in the 1967–68 season, when they beat Slavia VŠ Praha in the final that took place in Athens.

Nevertheless, Greek basketball was actually mainly boosted following the gold medal-winning triumph at the 1987 EuroBasket and runners-up 1989 EuroBasket, by the senior men's Greek National Team. In the following decades, Greek teams have dominated in European-wide professional club basketball, winning many trophies in continental competitions. Greek basketball clubs have won eighteen European-wide titles in totality.

Greek basketball clubs have also been runners-up in European continental-wide competition twelve times. Greek teams have won the European first-tier level competition, the EuroLeague, a total of nine times, with six EuroLeague championships being won by Panathinaikos and three EuroLeague championships being won by Olympiacos. Four Greek teams have won a European-wide second-tier level competition, the Cup Winners' Cup/Saporta Cup.

The Greek clubs that have won second-tier level European-wide competitions are AEK (two times), PAOK, Aris, and Maroussi. Three Greek teams have won a European-wide third-tier level cup, either the FIBA Korać Cup or the Basketball Champions League. Those clubs are Aris, PAOK and AEK. Aris has also won a fourth-tier level European-wide competition once, as they won the FIBA EuroCup Challenge.

Overall, twenty-two Greek basketball clubs have participated in European-wide competitions. AEK, Aris, Iraklis Thessaloniki, Maroussi, Olympiacos, Panathinaikos, Panellinios, Panionios and PAOK have each played in all of the main top three different level tiers. Peristeri has played in competitions of the first and third level tiers. Apollon Patras and Ionikos Neas Filadelfeias have played in competitions of the second and third level tiers. Makedonikos has only played in competitions of the second tier level, and YMCA Thessaloniki, Sporting, Near East, Ionikos Nikaias, Papagou, Irakleio, Olympia Larissa, Olympias Patras and Promitheas Patras BC have only played in competitions of the third level tier. Aris, Lavrio and Iraklis are the only clubs so far to participate at the fourth level tier FIBA Europe Cup.

The finals

European-wide competitions

World-wide competitions

Greek clubs in EuroLeague (first-tier)  1958 – today

Achievements

Appearances

Season to season

Greek clubs in FIBA Saporta Cup (second-tier) 1966/67 – 2001/02

Achievements

Appearances

Season to season

Greek clubs in EuroCup (second-tier) 2002/03 – today

Achievements

Appearances

Season to season

Greek clubs in Basketball Champions League (third-tier) 2016/17 – today

Achievements

Appearances

Season to season

Greek clubs in FIBA Korać Cup (third-tier) 1972–2001/02

Achievements

Appearances

Season to season

Greek clubs in FIBA EuroChallenge (third-tier) 2003/04 – 2014/15

Achievements

Appearances

Season to season

Greek clubs in FIBA Europe Cup (fourth-tier) 2015/16 – present

Achievements

Appearances

Season to season

See also
European basketball clubs in European and worldwide competitions:
 Croatia
 Czechoslovakia
 France
 Israel
 Italy
 Russia
 Spain
 Turkey
 USSR
 Yugoslavia

References